Alampur is a small village located  in Fatehgarh Sahib district, Punjab, India. It is one of the smallest villages of Punjab

Demographics 
The population of this village is 659 according to the 2011 census. The population of women is lesser than that of men.

Education
The village has a primary, secondary and nursery (known as aanganvari) level schools all located jointly. Bharat Bhushan is the principal of the primary school. The primary school has a staff of two who handle all the five classes.

Transportation

The village is well-connected to its neighboring villages Moran Wali, Mandwala, Ghumiara and Chandbaja.
It is connected to the following cities and villages by road.

There are two buses which come after every 30 minutes. The village is not connected to other villages by tempos.

Sports and health
The village has a gym located near the Sath of the village. It has exercise machines, weights and dumbbells. The village organizes a volleyball tournament each year. It has a very well-operating volleyball ground. The players from nearby villages daily come to play here and also participate in the volleyball tournament. it has many interested children.

References

 1Sunil Kumar Raina MD, 2Sushil Razdan DM (Neurology), 3KK Pandita MD 211 Prevalence of stroke in Kashmiri migrant community

Villages in Faridkot district